Joseph William Houser (July 3, 1891 – January 3, 1953) was a Major League Baseball pitcher who played for the Buffalo Buffeds in .

External links

1891 births
1953 deaths
Buffalo Buffeds players
Major League Baseball pitchers
Baseball players from Ohio
Steubenville Stubs players
Youngstown Indians players
Youngstown Steelmen players
New Castle Nocks players
Sharon Travelers players
Pittsburgh Filipinos players
Kansas City Packers players
Covington Blue Sox players
Syracuse Stars (minor league baseball) players
Lowell Grays players